The Biblical Elhanan was the son of Dodo (2 Samuel 23:24, 1 Chronicles 11:26). He was a member of King David’s elite fighters known as The Thirty.

Interpretation 
Moshe Garsiel believes he was in fact the same person as the Elhanan mentioned in 2 Samuel 21:19 and 1 Chronicles 20:5, the son of Jair from Bethlehem, and that the Bible is crediting him as the killer of Goliath. To explain the discrepancies in the text, Garsiel not only says that not only are they the same Elhanan, but also concludes "that Elhanan is David’s previous name before he became king." 

However, the view of most scholars is that the latter Elhanan was a different figure, and that Elhanan ben Jair was the person originally credited as slaying Goliath before the text was redacted by the Deuteronomist.

References

David's Mighty Warriors

ro:Elhanan